Space Warlord Organ Trading Simulator is a business simulation game developed and published by Strange Scaffold for Microsoft Windows, Xbox One, and Xbox Series X/S on December 7, 2021, and for Nintendo Switch on April 29, 2022. The game takes place in a far dystopian future where the player accrues power and wealth through the organ trade.

Gameplay
The game is centered around "trading days", that each only last a couple of minutes, in which the player has to deal with rival traders who are after the same organs, clients who want organs with specific properties, potential scammers, and random events. Fulfilling client requests adds to the player's reputation, which is this game's equivalent of XP, and the higher a player's reputation, the more the gameplay opens up.

Development
One of the game's more noteworthy features is its compatibility with the Kinect, a feature that was added "just for the hell of it". SWOTS lead designer Xalavier Nelson Jr. has offered a bounty of $50 to the first person to finish the campaign mode of the game entirely with the Kinect alone.

The game was released on Microsoft Windows via Steam, Xbox One, Xbox Series X/S on December 7, 2021, and on the Nintendo Switch on April 29, 2022. To celebrate the Switch release the game added cross-over content from the videogames Inscryption, Bugsnax and Among Us on all platforms.

Reception
The game received mixed reviews upon release, with the game having an aggregate score of 6.4 on Metacritic.  The game was praised for its soundtrack, which Nic Reuben from The Guardian described as "incredibly stylish" and "one of the best of the year". The game also received praise for its dark humor and storytelling, but was criticized for its shallow gameplay.

References

External links

2021 video games
Business simulation games
Indie video games
Kinect games
Organized crime video games
Organ trade in fiction
Parody video games
Retro-style video games
Science fiction video games
Video games developed in the United States
Video games with digitized sprites
Windows games
Xbox One games
Xbox Series X and Series S games
Nintendo Switch games